Ove ruke nisu male... 2 (These hands are not small... 2) is the second compilation album by the Serbian alternative rock band Disciplina Kičme, released by Tom Tom Music in 2005. The compilation features the material released on the second studio album, Svi za mnom!, as well as unreleased material from the period, including a live version of "Ne, ne, ne", a cover of the Smetana violin theme "Humoreska" and unreleased soundtrack for the Želimir Žilnik 1985 film Lepe žene prolaze kroz grad, the band had recorded but never released. The first part of the compilation, Ove ruke nisu male... 1, was released in 2000 by the same record label.

Track listing

Svi za mnom!

(Ne) Realizovana filmska muzika

Plus

References 
 Ove ruke nisu male... 2 at B92.fm
 EX YU ROCK enciklopedija 1960-2006, Janjatović Petar; 

2005 compilation albums
Serbian-language albums
Disciplina Kičme albums